Anna Boden and Ryan K. Fleck are an American filmmaking duo. They are best known for writing and directing Captain Marvel, which made more than 1 billion dollars at the box office globally. They are also known for their collaborations on the films Half Nelson, Sugar,  It's Kind of a Funny Story, and Mississippi Grind.

Early life 

Boden is originally from Massachusetts and grew up in Newton while Fleck graduated from Castro Valley High School. Before attending New York University's Tisch School of the Arts where he studied film, Fleck went to Diablo Valley College to study science and math. Boden attended Columbia University. The two met on the set of a student film where they bonded over the works of Robert Altman and, after Fleck had finished his thesis short film Struggle, they decided to collaborate.

Fleck was born in Berkeley, California and raised there and in Oakland. Fleck had grown up on classic fan favorites such as E.T. the Extra-Terrestrial and Back to the Future.

Boden has said that while there was no specific film that inspired her to pursue film making, she had a fondness for watching movies as a child and cites learning about Robert Altman as a turning point in how she viewed film as a medium.

Career 
Together they made the short documentaries Have You Seen This Man? and Young Rebels before they wrote and directed the short film Gowanus, Brooklyn, a sample feature aiming to attract potential financiers to their undeveloped script, Half Nelson.

The short won a prize at the 2004 Sundance Film Festival and Boden and Fleck were subsequently invited to the Sundance Writer's Lab to receive professional feedback on the Half Nelson screenplay. The film did not receive adequate financing for years, and while trying to initiate the project, Fleck explains: "We were trying to get it off the ground so we had plenty of time to keep writing and rewriting. I think the time was valuable because I think we made it as good as we could." Though Fleck was the only of the pair to receive directing credit for the film, he has gone on record and said that the work was an equal divide.

In spite of the effort in making the script "as good as we could" prior to filming, Fleck encouraged Half Nelson's actors to ad lib and improvise, although he and lead actor Ryan Gosling compromised many scenes in the rehearsal process as Fleck thought that Gosling's ideas were too different from the script in some cases. He also had several disagreements with Boden while writing; though he claims their "back and forth" system of rewriting each other's work has always worked well. Half Nelson was well received by critics and got nominated for an Academy Award for Best Actor for Ryan Gosling. Many other nominations went to Ryan Gosling for his role as Dan Dunne.

Boden and Fleck have since co-written and co-directed the 2008 film Sugar, which premiered at the 2008 Sundance Film Festival, about a 19-year-old Dominican man who immigrates to the United States to play minor league baseball. The two wrote the screenplay after researching about many Dominican immigrants who arrive in America to play in minor league towns, saying: "The stories we heard were so fascinating that it became what we were writing before we'd even decided it was our next project". They also collaborated on a screen adaptation of Ned Vizzini's young adult novel It's Kind of a Funny Story, which was released on October 8, 2010.

In 2012, the duo began work on a gambling movie called Mississippi Grind. The idea for the film came when they would visit riverboat casinos in Iowa. By this point in their career, Boden and Fleck had fully committed to each other, "In the early days of our partnership we had to navigate a lot of issues concerning trust and ego. Nowadays, those issues are almost entirely gone. Having a creative partner who you can wholly trust is a wonderful asset."

In April 2017, Boden and Fleck were hired to direct the Marvel Studios film Captain Marvel. They were previously considered to direct another Marvel film, Guardians of the Galaxy. Producer Kevin Feige said of them, "We met with lots and lots of people... and Anna and Ryan just had an amazing way of talking about Carol Danvers and talking about her journey... We want filmmakers that can help us focus on and elevate the character journey so it doesn't get lost amongst the spectacle." The film was released in March 2019, and became a box office success, grossing more than $1 billion worldwide. In May 2019, it was revealed they would direct the first two episodes and produce the television show Mrs. America starring Cate Blanchett as Phyllis Schlafly.  Boden and Fleck were in talks to direct a Marvel Disney+ series.

Personal life 
Boden and Fleck formerly dated, however, contrary to popular belief they are not a married couple (though multiple sources continue to erroneously report it). Boden was pregnant at the time of Mississippi Grinds release. Boden is Jewish.

Filmography

Film

Television 
Anna Boden

Ryan Fleck

References

External links 

1976 births
1979 births
American film editors
American women film producers
American film producers
American women film directors
Living people
Artists from Berkeley, California
American women screenwriters
Film directors from California
Columbia College (New York) alumni
Film producers from California
American television directors
American women television directors
American male screenwriters
Tisch School of the Arts alumni
Artists from Oakland, California
Filmmaking duos
Screenwriters from California
American women film editors